Henry Cheng Kar-shun, GBM, GBS (Chinese: 鄭家純; born 11 December 1946) is a Hong Kong billionaire property developer.

Cheng is the elder son of Cheng Yu-tung who founded Hong Kong-listed New World Development of which Henry succeeded his father as chairman. Cheng is chairman of NWS Holdings, New World China Land, and New World Department Store China.  He is also a Standing Committee Member of the Eleventh Chinese People’s Political Consultative Conference.

In the 2012 Chief Executive election in Hong Kong, Cheng  initially supported Henry Tang but switched to support the eventual winner, Leung Chun-ying. When Leung's second Secretary for Development, Paul Chan, became embroiled in a property and credibility scandal (as had the first, Mak Chai-kwong), Cheng was the first public figure to offer support.

Cheng has six children (from oldest to youngest): Adrian, Sonia, Brian, Christopher, Chak-wang and Chak-yin.

In 2016, Henry Cheng donated RMB$300 million to China Internet Development Foundation to support cyber security training.

He was awarded the Grand Bauhinia Medal (GBM) by the Hong Kong SAR Government in 2017.

References

External links
New World Development  Dr. Henry Cheng

1946 births
Living people
Hong Kong billionaires
Hong Kong businesspeople
New World Development people
NWS Holdings
University of Western Ontario alumni
Members of the National Committee of the Chinese People's Political Consultative Conference
Recipients of the Gold Bauhinia Star
Recipients of the Grand Bauhinia Medal
Members of the Selection Committee of Hong Kong
Members of the Election Committee of Hong Kong, 1998–2000
Members of the Election Committee of Hong Kong, 2000–2005
Members of the Election Committee of Hong Kong, 2007–2012
Members of the Election Committee of Hong Kong, 2012–2017
Members of the Election Committee of Hong Kong, 2017–2021
Billionaires from Guangdong
Democratic Alliance for the Betterment and Progress of Hong Kong politicians